is a Japanese long-distance runner who specializes in the marathon.

In the 10,000 metres he finished 20th at the 1999 World Championships. He finished eighteenth at the 2000 World Half Marathon Championships, and in the marathon he finished 20th at the 2005 World Championships, fourth at the 2006 Asian Games and 14th at the 2009 World Championships.

His personal best times are 7:56.80 minutes in the 3000 metres, achieved in June 2003 in Kushiro; 27:53.92 minutes in the 10,000 metres, achieved in May 2001 in Palo Alto; 1:01:36 hours in the half marathon, achieved in April 2005 in Yamaguchi; and 2:09:23 hours in the marathon, achieved in December 2008 in the Fukuoka Marathon.

Achievements

References

1975 births
Living people
Japanese male long-distance runners
Athletes (track and field) at the 2006 Asian Games
Japanese male marathon runners
Asian Games competitors for Japan
21st-century Japanese people